The Steppic Biogeographic Region is a biogeographic region of Europe, as defined by the European Environment Agency .

Extent

The Steppic region covers part of Romania, Moldova, Ukraine, Russia and western Kazakhstan, and extends further west into Asia.
It has low-lying plains and rolling hills or plateaus with an average elevation of

Environment

The natural vegetation is mostly grasses such as Elymus repens (couch grass), Stipa (feather grass) and Festuca (fescue), among which are scattered herbaceous plants such as Potentilla (cinquefoil), Verbascum (mullein and Artemisia (wormwood).
The humus-rich soils are very fertile, and much of the region has been converted to cultivated land, with few remaining pockets of the original vegetation.

Conservation

Romania has the only part of the Steppic Region in the European Union.
This is a small intensively farmed area.
The list of Natura 2000 sites in region was adopted in December 2008, with 34 Sites of Community Importance under the Habitats Directive and 40 Special Protection Areas under the Birds Directive. Some sites are in both categories.
Together they cover about 20% of the land in the Romanian part of the region.

Notes

Sources

Environment of Europe
Biogeography